Irwin Douglas Waldman is an American psychologist and geneticist who is professor of psychology at Emory University. He is known for his research in behavior genetics, such as the role of genetic factors in population and race differences in intelligence. This has included work on the Minnesota Transracial Adoption Study. He served as president of the Behavior Genetics Association from 2010 to 2011, and is now an associate editor for its official journal, Behavior Genetics.

References

External links
Faculty page

Living people
Behavior geneticists
Cornell University alumni
Emory University faculty
Race and intelligence controversy
University of Waterloo alumni
American geneticists
21st-century American psychologists
Year of birth missing (living people)